Vân Hà may refer to several places in Vietnam, including:

Vân Hà, Đông Anh, a commune of Đông Anh District in Hanoi
Vân Hà, Phúc Thọ, a commune of Phúc Thọ District in Hanoi
Vân Hà, Bắc Giang, a commune of Việt Yên District